Sunil Agnihotri is a Bollywood film and TV producer and director. He has been described as the "king of television costume dramas".

Work
Sunil Agnihotri started as an assistant director and did many films. His last as an assistant was with Late Mukul Anand's Agneepath, then in between the making of Agneepath, he decided to be independent and started working on Video Magazines Lehren and Chalte Chalte. He also made a very popular video film Don 11 in 1988 with the famous song Hawa Hawa. The video film was a rage and the most popular video film in those days. His first feature film was Danga Fasaad in 1990 with newcomers. The film was well appreciated with critics and masses. Then in 1992 he directed Laat Saab a picture which starred Jackie Shroff, Neelam and Mohsin Khan. He started a film in 1993 called Singer with Ajay Devgan, Shilpa Shirodkar, Nagma and Kader Khan, which is complete but was not released due to some dispute of the Producers. Then came Jai Kishen(1994) starring Akshay Kumar in a double role and Ayesha Julka. The film was a Semi Hit at the box office.
Sunil Agnihotri's first work for TV was the biggest success in 1994/95 with a fantasy series called 'Chandrakanta partly based on Devaki Nandan Khatri's novel Chandrakanta. The series became so successful because of its grand making and introduction of special fx that the entire India was at standstill from morning 9 to 10 a.m. on Sundays. Many actors from this series became very popular like Irrfan Khan, Rajendra Gupta, Kruttika Desai.
Then his series Yug, which ran from 1996 to 1998, tells the story of a freedom fighters struggling for freedom with the British, in the days of the British Raj. Yug was the biggest daily soap ever made with about 75 most popular actors those days starring with Hema malini, Ashwini Bhave, Mukesh Khanna, Dara Singh, A K Hangal, Vindu, Ameeta Nagia, Seema Kapoor, Neena Gupta, Sonu Walia and a Bunch of TV Actors of Mahabharat.
During this period of 1996 he made a feature film with Naseeruddin Shah, Akshay Kumar and Raveena Tandon called Davaa. Davaa was released in 1997 and was appreciated.
He then went on to produce and direct in 1997 a series called Betaal Pachisi which was a very successful as a TV fantasy series. However that year, he faced a lawsuit involving the US. King Features Syndicate filed a case arguing that Agnihotri had copied the idea of The Phantom comic strips for the Betaal series. 
However, the court said that only the unique expression of an idea could be protected, not the idea itself. After Betaal Pachisi Sunil Agnihotri went on to direct series like Satyawadi Raja HarishChandra, Gulsanober and so on.
Then, later in 2001 came his first series called Jai Ganesha for Zee TV, which starred Rupa Ganguly, Param Veer, Sonia Kapoor, Rajendra Gupta and others, after doing a couple of Thrillers at 10, this mythology which was entirely based on Special FX for the first time came on television. Roopa Ganguly was Parvati of the cutest Ganesha ever on Indian screen, The series on Sunday mornings was a highest rated series on television.
Agnihotri's 2002 Aa Gale Lag Jaa series was based on the 1973 film Aa Gale Lag Jaa by Manmohan Desai.
The serial was full of songs, which were released on cassette, and was shot like a musical.
In 2003 Sunil Agnihotri caused controversy when it was announced that he was to commence work on a film entitled The Murder of a Missionary, based on Graham Staines, an Australian missionary who was burned to death in his car with his two young sons in January 1999 by a mob of Hindu fanatics. Subash Chouhan of the Bajrang Dal said "We will not allow the producer to shoot ... Such films will encourage the conversion of poor tribals to Christianity".
In 2004/05 his Zindagi Ek Safar was based on problems of independent women and the series ran for more than 300 episodes, then came a Fantasy called Chandramukhi in 2006/07 which again got highest TRP's.
In 2006 he made a feature film again a fantasy, the most popular Arabian Tale with Arbaaz Khan called Ali Baba Chalis Chor.
He tried Horror series for 9X called Black in 2009/10 and then again came the other fantasy, inspired from Devki Nandans Khatri's Kahani Chandrakanta Ki.
He had produced and directed the sequel to Chandrakanta.  He ran into a copyright challenge on the second project
from Nirja Guleri, who had produced the first TV series. Kahani Chandrakanta Ki is a lavish costume drama, a historical fantasy.
In 2012 he started a feature film again with the most popular singers Shaan and Mika along with a Brazilian model Gabriela Bertante called Balwinder Singh Famous Ho Gaya and the film was released in September 2014, which unfortunately was not good at the box office.

Filmography

References

External links
 
 

Living people
20th-century Indian film directors
Hindi-language film directors
Indian television directors
21st-century Indian film directors
Year of birth missing (living people)